Eden or Eden Stretch is an unincorporated community located in Butler County, Kentucky, in the United States.

References

Unincorporated communities in Butler County, Kentucky
Unincorporated communities in Kentucky